In mathematics, a group action on a space is a group homomorphism of a given group into the group of transformations of the space. Similarly, a group action on a mathematical structure is a group homomorphism of a group into the automorphism group of the structure. It is said that the group acts on the space or structure. If a group acts on a structure, it will usually also act on objects built from that structure. For example, the group of Euclidean isometries acts on Euclidean space and also on the figures drawn in it. For example, it acts on the set of all triangles. Similarly, the group of symmetries of a polyhedron acts on the vertices, the edges, and the faces of the polyhedron.

A group action on a vector space is called a representation of the group.

The symmetric group  acts on any set with  elements by permuting the elements of the set. Although the group of all permutations of a set depends formally on the set, the concept of group action allows one to consider a single group for studying the permutations of all sets with the same cardinality.

Definition

Left group action 

that satisfies the following two axioms:
{|
|Identity:
|
|-
|Compatibility:
|
|}

{|
|Identity:
|
|-
|Compatibility:
|
|}

Right group action 

that satisfies the analogous axioms:
{|
|Identity:
|
|-
|Compatibility:
|
|}

{|
|Identity:
|
|-
|Compatibility:
|
|}

For a left action,  acts first, followed by  second. For a right action,  acts first, followed by  second. Because of the formula , a left action can be constructed from a right action by composing with the inverse operation of the group.

Thus, for establishing general properties of group actions, it suffices to consider only left actions. However, there are cases where this is not possible. For example, the multiplication of a group induces both a left action and a right action on the group itself—multiplication on the left and on the right, respectively.

Remarkable properties of actions 
Let  be a group acting on a set . The action is called  or  if  for all  implies that .

The action is called  (or semiregular or fixed-point free) if the statement that  for some  already implies that . This is a much stronger property than faithfulness.

For example, the action of any group on itself by left multiplication is free. This observation implies Cayley's theorem that any group can be embedded in a symmetric group (which is infinite when the group is). A finite group may act faithfully on a set of size much smaller than its cardinality (however such an action cannot be free). For instance the abelian 2-group  (of cardinality ) acts faithfully on a set of size .

In general the smallest set on which a faithful action can be defined can vary greatly for groups of the same size. For example, three groups of size 120 are the symmetric group , the icosahedral group  and the cyclic group . The smallest sets on which faithful actions can be defined for these groups are of size 5, 12, and 16 respectively.

Transitivity properties

This means that  given  the element  in the definition of transitivity is unique.

For  this is often called double, respectively triple, transitivity. The class of 2-transitive groups (that is, subgroups of a finite symmetric group whose action is 2-transitive) and more generally multiply transitive groups is well-studied in finite group theory.

Examples
If  has cardinality  the action of the alternating group is -transitive but not -transitive. 

The action of the orthogonal group of a Euclidean space is not transitive on nonzero vectors but it is on the unit sphere.

Primitive actions

Topological properties

The domain of discontinuity of the action is the set of all points of discontinuity. In a dynamical context this is also called wandering set. 

The action is properly discontinuous if for every compact subset  there are finitely many  such that .

The action by deck transformations of the fundamental group of a locally simply connected space on an covering space is wandering and free. Such actions can be characterized by the following property: every  has a neighbourhood  such that  for every . Actions with this property are sometimes called freely discontinuous, and the largest subset on which the action is freely discontinuous is then called the free regular set. 

An action of a group  on a locally compact space  is called cocompact if there exists a compact subset  such that . For a properly discontinuous action, cocompactness is equivalent to compactness of the quotient space .

Actions of topological groups

Now assume  is a topological group and  a topological space on which it acts by homeomorphisms. The action is said to be continuous if the map  is continuous for the product topology.

This means that given compact sets  the set of  such that  is compact. In particular, this is equivalent to proper discontinuity when  is a discrete group. 

The action is said to be strongly continuous if the orbital map  is continuous for every . Contrary to what the name suggests, this is a weaker property than continuity of the action.

If  is a Lie group and  a differentiable manifold, then the subspace of smooth points for the action is the set of points  such that the map  is smooth. There is a well-developed theory of Lie group actions, i.e. action which are smooth on the whole space.

Linear actions

If  acts by linear transformations on a module over a commutative ring, the action is said to be irreducible if there are no proper nonzero -invariant submodules. It is said to be semisimple if it decomposes as a direct sum of irreducible actions.

Orbits and stabilizers 

Consider a group G acting on a set X. The  of an element x in X is the set of elements in X to which x can be moved by the elements of G. The orbit of x is denoted by :

The defining properties of a group guarantee that the set of orbits of (points x in) X under the action of G form a partition of X. The associated equivalence relation is defined by saying  if and only if there exists a g in G with  The orbits are then the equivalence classes under this relation; two elements x and y are equivalent if and only if their orbits are the same, that is, 

The group action is transitive if and only if it has exactly one orbit, that is, if there exists x in X with  This is the case if and only if  for  x in X (given that X is non-empty).

The coinvariant terminology and notation are used particularly in group cohomology and group homology, which use the same superscript/subscript convention.

Invariant subsets
If Y is a subset of X, then  denotes the set  The subset Y is said to be invariant under G if  (which is equivalent to ). In that case, G also operates on Y by restricting the action to Y. The subset Y is called fixed under G if  for all g in G and all y in Y. Every subset that is fixed under G is also invariant under G, but not conversely.

Every orbit is an invariant subset of X on which G acts transitively. Conversely, any invariant subset of X is a union of orbits. The action of G on X is transitive if and only if all elements are equivalent, meaning that there is only one orbit.

A G-invariant element of X is  such that  for all  The set of all such x is denoted  and called the G-invariants of X. When X is a G-module, XG is the zeroth cohomology group of G with coefficients in X, and the higher cohomology groups are the derived functors of the functor of G-invariants.

Fixed points and stabilizer subgroups
Given g in G and x in X with  it is said that "x is a fixed point of g" or that "g fixes x".

This is a subgroup of G, though typically not a normal one. The action of G on X is free if and only if all stabilizers are trivial. The kernel N of the homomorphism with the symmetric group,  is given by the intersection of the stabilizers Gx for all x in X. If N is trivial, the action is said to be faithful (or effective).

The above says that the stabilizers of elements in the same orbit are conjugate to each other. Thus, to each orbit, we can associate a conjugacy class of a subgroup of G (that is, the set of all conjugates of the subgroup). A maximal orbit type is often called a principal orbit type.

and Burnside's lemma
Orbits and stabilizers are closely related. For a fixed x in X, consider the map  given by  By definition the image  of this map is the orbit  The condition for two elements to have the same image is

In other words,  if and only if  and  lie in the same coset for the stabilizer subgroup  Thus, the fiber  of f over any y in G·x is contained in such a coset, and every such coset also occurs as a fiber. This result is known as the orbit-stabilizer theorem.

If G is finite then the orbit-stabilizer theorem, together with Lagrange's theorem, gives

in other words the length of the orbit of x times the order of its stabilizer is the order of the group. In particular that implies that the orbit length is a divisor of the group order.

 Example: Let G be a group of prime order p acting on a set X with k elements. Since each orbit has either 1 or p elements, there are at least  orbits of length 1 which are G-invariant elements.

This result is especially useful since it can be employed for counting arguments (typically in situations where X is finite as well).

 Example:  We can use the orbit-stabilizer theorem to count the automorphisms of a graph. Consider the cubical graph as pictured, and let G denote its automorphism group. Then G acts on the set of vertices {1, 2, ..., 8}, and this action is transitive as can be seen by composing rotations about the center of the cube. Thus, by the orbit-stabilizer theorem,  Applying the theorem now to the stabilizer  we can obtain  Any element of G that fixes 1 must send 2 to either 2, 4, or 5. Thus,  Applying the theorem a third time gives  Any element of G that fixes 1 and 2 must send 3 to either 3 or 6. Reflecting the cube at the plane through 1,2,7 and 8 is such an automorphism sending 3 to 6, thus . One also sees that  consists only of the identity automorphism, as any element of G fixing 1, 2 and 3 must also fix all other vertices, since they are determined by their adjacency to 1, 2 and 3. Combining the preceding calculations, we can now obtain 

A result closely related to the orbit-stabilizer theorem is Burnside's lemma:

where Xg is the set of points fixed by g. This result is mainly of use when G and X are finite, when it can be interpreted as follows: the number of orbits is equal to the average number of points fixed per group element.

Fixing a group G, the set of formal differences of finite G-sets forms a ring called the Burnside ring of G, where addition corresponds to disjoint union, and multiplication to Cartesian product.

Examples 
 In every group G, left multiplication is an action of G on G:  for all g, x in G. This action is free and transitive (regular), and forms the basis of a rapid proof of Cayley's theorem - that every group is isomorphic to a subgroup of the symmetric group of permutations of the set G.
 In every group G with subgroup H, left multiplication is an action of G on the set of cosets G/H:  for all g,a in G. In particular if H contains no nontrivial normal subgroups of G this induces an isomorphism from G to a subgroup of the permutation group of degree [G : H].
 In every group G, conjugation is an action of G on G: . An exponential notation is commonly used for the right-action variant: ; it satisfies (.
 In every group G with subgroup H, conjugation is an action of G on conjugates of H:  for all g in G and K conjugates of H.
 The symmetric group Sn and its subgroups act on the set  by permuting its elements
 The symmetry group of a polyhedron acts on the set of vertices of that polyhedron. It also acts on the set of faces or the set of edges of the polyhedron.
 The symmetry group of any geometrical object acts on the set of points of that object.
 The automorphism group of a vector space (or graph, or group, or ring . . .) acts on the vector space (or set of vertices of the graph, or group, or ring . . .).
 The general linear group  and its subgroups, particularly its Lie subgroups (including the special linear group , orthogonal group , special orthogonal group , and symplectic group ) are Lie groups that act on the vector space Kn. The group operations are given by multiplying the matrices from the groups with the vectors from Kn.
 The general linear group  acts on Zn by natural matrix action. The orbits of its action are classified by the greatest common divisor of coordinates of the vector in Zn.
 The affine group acts transitively on the points of an affine space, and the subgroup V of the affine group (that is, a vector space) has transitive and free (that is, regular) action on these points; indeed this can be used to give a definition of an affine space.
 The projective linear group  and its subgroups, particularly its Lie subgroups, which are Lie groups that act on the projective space Pn(K). This is a quotient of the action of the general linear group on projective space.
The isometries of the plane act on the set of 2D images and patterns, such as wallpaper patterns. The definition can be made more precise by specifying what is meant by image or pattern, for example, a function of position with values in a set of colors. Isometries are in fact one example of affine group (action).
The sets acted on by a group G comprise the category of G-sets in which the objects are G-sets and the morphisms are G-set homomorphisms: functions  such that  for every g in G.
 The Galois group of a field extension L/K acts on the field L but has only a trivial action on elements of the subfield K. Subgroups of Gal(L/K) correspond to subfields of L that contain K, that is, intermediate field extensions between L and K.
Given a group action of G on X, we can define an induced action of G on the power set of X, by setting  for every subset U of X and every g in G. This is useful, for instance, in studying the action of the large Mathieu group on a 24-set and in studying symmetry in certain models of finite geometries.
 The quaternions with norm 1 (the versors), as a multiplicative group, act on R3: for any such quaternion , the mapping  is a counterclockwise rotation through an angle α about an axis given by a unit vector v; z is the same rotation; see quaternions and spatial rotation. Note that this is not a faithful action because the quaternion −1 leaves all points where they were, as does the quaternion 1.
This G-set has the property that its fixed points correspond to equivariant maps ; more generally, it is an exponential object in the category of G-sets.

Group actions and groupoids 

The notion of group action can be encoded by the action groupoid  associated to the group action. The stabilizers of the action are the vertex groups of the groupoid and the orbits of the action are its components.

Morphisms and isomorphisms between G-sets 
If X and Y are two G-sets, a morphism from X to Y is a function  such that  for all g in G and all x in X. Morphisms of G-sets are also called equivariant maps or G-maps.

The composition of two morphisms is again a morphism. If a morphism f is bijective, then its inverse is also a morphism. In this case f is called an isomorphism, and the two G-sets X and Y are called isomorphic; for all practical purposes, isomorphic G-sets are indistinguishable.

Some example isomorphisms:
 Every regular G action is isomorphic to the action of G on G given by left multiplication.
(S can be taken to be the set of orbits X/G.)
 Every transitive G action is isomorphic to left multiplication by G on the set of left cosets of some subgroup H of G. (H can be taken to be the stabilizer group of any element of the original G-set.)

With this notion of morphism, the collection of all G-sets forms a category; this category is a Grothendieck topos (in fact, assuming a classical metalogic, this topos will even be Boolean).

Variants and generalizations 
We can also consider actions of monoids on sets, by using the same two axioms as above. This does not define bijective maps and equivalence relations however. See semigroup action.

Instead of actions on sets, we can define actions of groups and monoids on objects of an arbitrary category: start with an object X of some category, and then define an action on X as a monoid homomorphism into the monoid of endomorphisms of X. If X has an underlying set, then all definitions and facts stated above can be carried over. For example, if we take the category of vector spaces, we obtain group representations in this fashion.

We can view a group G as a category with a single object in which every morphism is invertible. A (left) group action is then nothing but a (covariant) functor from G to the category of sets, and a group representation is a functor from G to the category of vector spaces. A morphism between G-sets is then a natural transformation between the group action functors.  In analogy, an action of a groupoid is a functor from the groupoid to the category of sets or to some other category.

In addition to continuous actions of topological groups on topological spaces, one also often considers smooth actions of Lie groups on smooth manifolds, regular actions of algebraic groups on algebraic varieties, and actions of group schemes on schemes. All of these are examples of group objects acting on objects of their respective category.

Gallery

See also
 Gain graph
 Group with operators
 Measurable group action
 Monoid action

Notes

Citations

References

External links
 
 

Group theory
 
Representation theory of groups
Symmetry